Shinobu Akiyama (秋山 忍 b. 1957) is a Japanese botanist who works at the Tsukuba Botanical Garden studying the taxonomy of spermatophytes, particularly in the Tibetan plateau and Himalayan mountains   , she is the author or one of the authors of 170 taxon names in the International Plant Names Index.

Works

References 

1957 births
20th-century Japanese women scientists
20th-century Japanese botanists
Living people
21st-century Japanese botanists
21st-century Japanese women scientists